Marius Silviu Alexe (born 22 February 1990) is a Romanian footballer who plays as a striker.

Club career

Dinamo București 
Alexe started his football career when he was 10 years old at Dinamo București. From the very beginning, the talented boy attracted the attention of his coach, who was impressed with his attacking attributes and used him as a forward and later as a left winger.

His great potential did not go unnoticed by Europe's top clubs, and in 2006, when he was 16 years old, Rangers made an offer for him (according to rumours they bid €250K for the gifted striker), with fellow Scottish outfits Hearts and Aberdeen also expressing interest in acquiring his services. But Alexe opted to stay at his home club and gain experience in his homeland before thinking about a move abroad.

Loan to Astra 
He was loaned to the Romanian side Astra Ploiești and helped the team get promoted to Romania's Liga I with six goals in 23 games.  His debut in Romania's Liga I came on 2 August 2009 with Astra, but his loan spell was cut short when Dinamo called him back after only three games for his adopted side due to his great performance against rivals Rapid, against who he bagged a brace.

Breakthrough at Dinamo 
He returned to his home club and scored another five goals in 29 games, gaining experience and becoming a crucial component of the first-team squad. Alexe also played for Romania Under 21s alongside his teammate Gabriel Torje, another talented and promising young player, and together they led the team in some great performances, although they ultimately ended up losing to England in the Euro 2011 qualifiers.

After an impressive 2009–10 season, his evolutions brought the attention of Chelsea, but Dinamo asked €5 million for the player and the transaction failed.

On 16 April 2012, Alexe scored two goals in a game against Concordia Chiajna. He dedicated his goals to his father, who had died. A week later, on 22 April, Alexe confirmed he had regained his past from, by scoring another two goals in the 3–2 victory against Ceahlăul Piatra Neamț.

Loan to Sassuolo 
After expressing his wish in the end of the first training camp of Dinamo to leave the club, Alexe completed a move to Sassuolo on 9 July 2013. He joined on loan, for €500k, with the newly promoted Serie A team having an option to make the deal permanent for €2 million which would acquire 90% of the player's rights by the end of the season. Dinamo București will also receive from this loan €300k if Alexe scores 10 goals and another €400k if he scores 15.

He injured himself during a training session in January 2014, suffering a tear of the anterior cruciate ligaments of the left knee. Thus, he was forced to take a six months break and Sassuolo decided to send the player back to Romania and didn't activate the option to buy him at the end of the loaning period.

Back to Dinamo 
Alexe came back to Dinamo and after the end of the rehabilitation, he returned to the first squad. On 30 August 2014, he played again for Dinamo, 459 days after his last game for the Bucharest team.

Kardemir Karabükspor 
On 22 July 2015, Alexe was transferred to Turkish team Kardemir Karabükspor, where he signed a contract for two years.

Concordia Chiajna 
On 6 February 2019 CS Concordia Chiajna announced that Marius Alexe signed a contract with the club.

Argeș Pitești 
On 13 September 2019 Argeș Pitești announced that Marius Alexe signed a contract with the club.

International career 

Alexe has played for a number of youth teams, starting with Romania U-17 for which he played 6 games and scored 1 goal. He also played for Romania U-19, where he amassed 8 games and scored 1 goal, and Romania U-21 for which he has played 10 times.

Alexe played his first match for Romania national football team in a game against Luxembourg on 29 March 2011. He came on in the 84th minute for Adrian Mutu.

Playing style 
Alexe is able to play both as a striker and as a left winger. His greatest assets are without a doubt his speed and technique. Alexe has great acceleration and very impressive pace, enabling him to dominate the left flank. He possesses great dribbling skills, control and passing ability, which, along with his agility, make him a very tough player to mark. Alexe is naturally right footed, but it is barely noticeable because he controls the ball so well with either foot. He is very elegant in his playing style, and just like Thierry Henry, he likes to wait on the left flank for the ball, before cutting into the middle and looking for the target. Not only is Alexe able to produce scoring opportunities to his teammates, his great finishing allows him to score goals from almost any range, and that, together with his great heading ability, makes him an excellent option as a striker.

Club statistics 
Statistics accurate as of match played 23 December 2019

Honours

Club 
Dinamo Bucharest:
Romanian Cup: 2011–12
Romanian Supercup: 2012

References

External links 

1990 births
Living people
Footballers from Bucharest
Romanian footballers
Association football forwards
FC Dinamo București players
FC Astra Giurgiu players
U.S. Sassuolo Calcio players
Kardemir Karabükspor footballers
FK Železiarne Podbrezová players
Aris Limassol FC players
CS Concordia Chiajna players
FC Argeș Pitești players
Liga I players
Serie A players
TFF First League players
Slovak Super Liga players
Cypriot First Division players
Süper Lig players
Liga II players
Romanian expatriate footballers
Expatriate footballers in Italy
Romanian expatriate sportspeople in Italy
Expatriate footballers in Turkey
Romanian expatriate sportspeople in Turkey
Romanian expatriate sportspeople in Cyprus
Romanian expatriate sportspeople in Slovakia
Expatriate footballers in Slovakia
Expatriate footballers in Cyprus
Romania under-21 international footballers
Romania international footballers
Romania youth international footballers